Kelvin Gladstone Peter Hendrie (2 July 1898 – December ) was a Scottish international rugby union player, who played for  and the Lions.

He played at No. 8 for Heriot's FP. He was capped for Scotland three times and was on the 1924 British Lions tour to South Africa, where he played in one test.

References

 Bath, Richard (ed.) The Scotland Rugby Miscellany (Vision Sports Publishing Ltd, 2007 )
 Massie, Allan A Portrait of Scottish Rugby (Polygon, Edinburgh)
 Scotland/Players & Officials/Kevin Hendrie

1898 births
1953 deaths
British & Irish Lions rugby union players from Scotland
Heriot's RC players
Scotland international rugby union players
Scottish rugby union players